Fancypants is a 2011 film directed by Joshua Russell and starring Patrick Gleason, Roddy Piper, and Robert Carradine. Featuring Nick Turturro, Richard Kind, and introducing Jackson Dunn.

It is a comedy/drama about a professional wrestler who is afraid of conflict in real life.  He is nearing the end of his career and finds out he has one fan left in an 8-year-old boy, who hides a secret that will change Leo's life forever.  The film was shot entirely on location in Chicago.

The film won Best Feature at the 2011 Sunscreen Film Festival in St. Petersburg, Florida, and was an official selection at the 2011 Seattle True Independent Film Festival and the 2012 Treasure Coast Film Festival in Fort Pierce, Florida.  The movie premiered in Chicago on September 29, 2011.  It had a limited theatrical release, then was released nationwide on February 10, 2012 via Comcast On Demand, and March 13, 2012 through Time Warner, Cox, Charter, and all other cable providers.  It is distributed in the US by Lightning Entertainment and Entertainment Content Management.

References

External links
 
 
 The New York Times article - 2011
 Chicago Sun-Times article - 2011
 Daily Herald article 2011
 Chicago Reader article 2011
 Chicago Tribune article - June 13, 2008
 Chicago Tribune article - August 13, 2008
 Time Out Chicago   article - July 3, 2008

2011 films
2011 comedy-drama films
American comedy-drama films
2010s English-language films
2010s American films